Jeff Seeman is an American writer and comedian. He wrote the screenplay for the 2009 film American Virgin (previously Virgin on Bourbon Street), starring Rob Schneider and Jenna Dewan, and directed by Claire Kilner.  He's also the author of two novels, Political Science and Guns and Butter.

Seeman is a former editor of the Cornell Lunatic, the Cornell University campus humor magazine.  He has performed stand-up comedy in Los Angeles, San Francisco, and Boston.

External links

Living people
American male comedians
21st-century American comedians
American male writers
Year of birth missing (living people)